Tarso Toon (sometimes also known as Tarso Toh; "Tarso" means "high plateau".) is a volcano in the central Tibesti mountains.

It was active in the Miocene, developing over older ignimbrites with tholeiitic rocks. Later, felsic volcanic rocks were emplaced within the caldera and the Voon ignimbrite buried parts of the tholeiite.

References

Sources

External links

See also 

 Tarso Toh, an unrelated volcano

Miocene shield volcanoes
Volcanoes of Chad
Calderas of Chad
Polygenetic shield volcanoes